Wayzata is a city in Hennepin County, Minnesota, United States. Known for its small-town character and lakeside location, Wayzata is frequented by local boaters, shoppers, and restaurant goers.   

The population was 4,434 as of the 2020 census. U.S. Route 12 passes through the city. One of Wayzata's landmarks is the Wayzata Train Depot, a historic and quaint rail station along the shores of Lake Minnetonka.

History

Early history

The name "Wayzata" comes from the Dakota word meaning “north” or “north shore.” The Mdewakanton, a subtribe of the Dakota nation, treasured Lake Minnetonka—the "Big Water"—as a place for hunting, fishing, and harvesting wild rice and maple sap. Spirit Knob, a peninsula in Wayzata Bay, was regarded as a particularly sacred place. The Dakota resided in this area of Minnesota until 1851, when the Treaty of Mendota was signed and land west of the Mississippi was opened for Euro-American settlement. Most Dakota were exiled from Minnesota after 1862.

Oscar E. Garrison originally platted Wayzata in 1854. In 1855, it saw an influx of settlers, who built a sawmill, a hotel, and a blacksmith shop. Most early settlers made their living by clear-cutting the land to grow corn and wheat. In 1857, this flourishing economy was nearly terminated by a grasshopper infestation, but the community rebounded when ginseng was discovered in the remaining hardwood forest. Ginseng root was in great demand as an aphrodisiac in China. During this boom, Wayzata became a collection center for ginseng roots discovered around Lake Minnetonka.

In 1867 the Saint Paul and Pacific Railroad extended its tracks to Wayzata, making it the area's transportation hub. The railroad was particularly important to local farmers because they now had easy access to markets in Minneapolis, Saint Paul, and beyond. The railroad also made Wayzata the original "gateway" to Lake Minnetonka, which was billed as a place of commanding beauty and good health.

Resort period

In the 1860s and 1870s many small hotels and boarding houses were erected around Wayzata and Lake Minnetonka to accommodate tourists. One early example was the Maurer House-West Hotel, which was built near the corner of Lake Street and Broadway Avenue. Most local hotels and boarding houses were rather primitive until 1879, when the 150-room Hotel Saint Louis was built in Deephaven. The Lake Park Hotel in Tonka Bay, Arlington Hotel in Wayzata, and the massive Hotel Lafayette in Minnetonka Beach soon followed. These large, grandiose hotels primarily catered to wealthy tourists who came from the East and South to spend entire summers on Lake Minnetonka.

Most Lake Minnetonka tourists in the late 1800s arrived in Wayzata by train. Steamboats waited for new arrivals near the foot of Broadway Avenue and took them to destinations across the lake. Some of these steamboats, such as the City of Saint Louis and Belle of Minnetonka, were quite large.

Wayzata was officially incorporated as a village in 1883. One of the village council's first orders of business was to reroute the railroad tracks north of town. James J. Hill, who had become chairman of the newly formed Saint Paul, Minneapolis, & Manitoba Railway in 1879, initially ignored the council's order. When the council took the case to court, Hill reacted by demolishing the train station at the foot of Broadway Avenue and building a new one east of town at a stop called "Holdridge." He declared that Wayzata residents could "walk a mile for the next twenty years" to catch the train. Hill moved the tracks as well, but rather than rerouting them north of town, he moved them closer to the lake.

Hill was also connected to Wayzata and Lake Minnetonka through the Arlington Hotel, Hotel Lafayette, and Belle of Minnetonka, all owned by the Saint Paul, Minneapolis, & Manitoba Railway. He purchased Wayzata's Arlington Hotel in 1881 and never reopened it. Due to its impractical size, the Belle of Minnetonka steamboat was laid up by the mid-1880s. The Hotel Lafayette continued to operate until it burned to the ground in 1897. By that time Lake Minnetonka had largely fallen out of favor as a vacation destination for wealthy tourists. A number of factors including new railroad regulations, new vacation spots, and a national economic depression contributed to this decline.

Cottage period

As national tourism to Lake Minnetonka faded in the 1890s, a new era for Wayzata began. Many urban dwellers began to construct summer cottages along Lake Minnetonka's shores as the Twin Cities grew. While many of these new cottages were modest, some were monumental. Wayzata became home to a large collection of grand country estates along the Ferndale Shore. Notable families who built country estates there include the Bells, Boveys, Crosbys, Peaveys, Pillsburys, and Washburns.

Despite the influx of new summer residences, Wayzata barely grew during this period. That changed in 1905, when the village council voted for a Reconciliation Ordinance to repair relations with Hill and his railway (now known as the “Great Northern”). He responded by building a new train depot near downtown Wayzata. At the depot's grand opening celebration in 1906, he declared it the “handsomest” on the entire Great Northern line.

Wayzata was also connected to a new form of water transportation in 1906. The Twin City Rapid Transit Company launched six new “Express Boats” on Lake Minnetonka that served as an extension of the Twin City streetcar system. Designed by Royal C. Moore of Wayzata, the boats provided fast, reliable transportation for Lake Minnetonka residents. There were connections to streetcars in Excelsior, Deephaven, and Tonka Bay. In Wayzata, passengers could transfer to Great Northern Railway trains. This convenient service was very popular until about 1920, when local roads began to be improved for automobiles. The service was discontinued in 1926 after several years of declining ridership. Some of the Express Boats were scuttled (purposely sunk) in the lake that year. One, the Minnehaha, was raised from the depths in 1980, restored, and returned to passenger service in 1996.

As the cottage era continued, downtown Wayzata rebounded with residences and small commercial centers at each end of Lake Street. Wayzata State Bank was established in 1909 as the area's first local financial institution. The bank's first president was Moore, who owned Moore Boat Works on Wayzata Bay. He eventually sold his boat business to Eugene Ramaley. Motorboating was all the rage by 1920, and Wayzata was at the center of the trend with two nationally famous boat makers, Ramaley and Wise, based there. In 1929 the Ramaley Boat Company merged with Wise Boat Works and Walker Boat Works to form Minnetonka Boat Works. Minnetonka Boat Works eventually became well-known manufacturers and distributors of Tonka-Craft and Chris-Craft power boats.

20th century

Wayzata's population nearly doubled in the decades leading up to World War II. Wayzatans were fortunate when one of their own, Mayor Rufus Rand, stepped forward to lead the town in meeting the challenges of modernizing its infrastructure. Under Rand, water and sewer service was provided to every building, streetlights were installed, roads were paved, and the public beach and park was opened. During his tenure, Rand also served as the executive of a large gas company and a regent of the University of Minnesota.

After World War II, many local farms and summer cottages were converted for use as year-round, single-family homes. Many new homes and gas stations were also constructed during this time. At one point, Wayzata had ten gas stations to serve a growing number of commuters and their cars. U.S. Highway 12, which was built in the 1920s, was widened to four lanes, and the population swelled. Downtown Wayzata residences were replaced by more stores serving not only Wayzatans, but also new families moving onto the former farmlands just outside Wayzata. By the 1950s, the greater Minneapolis-Saint Paul metropolitan area had reached Wayzata.

After it became a charter city, Wayzata began to annex land from Minnetonka, Plymouth, and Orono, and doubled in size. U.S. Highway 12 was widened again to become a freeway in the 1970s and a new shopping center opened  down the road. These physical and economic changes caused some of Wayzata's downtown shops to be replaced by condominiums and office buildings. Strip malls and fast food franchises came to a part of the town near the highway.

Residences also began returning to downtown as several condominium and townhouse developments appeared in the 1980s and 1990s. By the 1990s, Wayzata began to see an uptick in the demolition and replacement of older homes and commercial buildings.

21st century

In 2003, Wayzatans passed a referendum to have the city buy the community's last remaining stand of the Big Woods for use as a park. A new city hall and library were also constructed that year.

Geography
Wayzata is a western suburb of Minneapolis, Minnesota,  to its west on the northeast tip of Lake Minnetonka. The "land cover types" that compose the Wayzata area in descending order by square acreage are open water (36%); residential areas, farmsteads, and commercial lands (35%); forest (13%); and farms (8%).

Climate 
Wayzata's climate is humid continental, with hot summers, cold winters, and moderate autumns and springs. Average summer temperatures range from 56 to 82 degrees Fahrenheit. Average winter temperatures range from 2 to 27 degrees Fahrenheit.

Ecology

Before it was settled by Euro-Americans, the Wayzata area was largely "upland deciduous forest, with small inclusions of wet prairie, and lakes." Forest types typical in and around Wayzata have been "maple-basswood forest, oak forest, lowland hardwood forest, and floodplain forest. Non-native forest types within the city were predominantly disturbed second growth forest types made up of elm, box elder, ash, and cottonwood, with occasional basswood, maple, and oak." Some of the species of plants considered invasive in the Wayzata area are purple loosestrife, narrow-leaf cattail, common buckthorn, leafy spurge, tartarian honeysuckle, garlic mustard, reed canary grass, Siberian elm, and Amur maple. Some rare native species have also been seen in Wayzata, including the Acadian flycatcher, pugnose shiner, and red-shouldered hawk.

Demographics

2010 Census
As of the census of 2010, there were 3,688 people, 1,795 households, and 944 families residing in the city. The racial makeup of the city was 92.5% White, 3.0% African American, 0.4% Native American, 1.3% Asian, 0.1% Pacific Islander, 1.5% from other races, and 1.1% from two or more races. Hispanic or Latino of any race were 3.6% of the population.

There were 1,795 households, of which 20.8% included children under the age of 18, 42.3% were married couples living together, 7.2% had a female householder with no husband present, 3.1% had a male householder with no wife present, and 47.4% were non-families; 41.6% of all households were made up of individuals, and 18.3% had someone living alone who was 65 years of age or older. The average household size was 2.04, and the average family size was 2.80.

The median age in the city was 47.8 years; 19.1% of residents were under the age of 18; 6.3% were between the ages of 18 and 24; 20.7% were from 25 to 44; 31.9% were from 45 to 64; and 22.2% were 65 years of age or older. Among residents of the city, 47.5% were male and 52.5% were female.

2000 Census
As of the census of 2013, there were 4,113 people, 1,929 households, and 1,041 families residing in the city. The population density was 1,292.6 persons per square mile (499.4/km). The racial makeup of the city was 96.11% White, 0.41% African American, 0.32% Native American, 1.34% Asian, 0.19% Pacific Islander, 0.75% from other races, and 0.88% from two or more races. Hispanic or Latino of any race were 1.41% of the population.

There were 1,929 households, of which 20.9% included children under the age of 18, 46.6% were married couples living together, 5.3% had a female householder with no husband present, and 46.0% were non-families; 39.5% of all households were made up of individuals, and 17.0% had someone living alone who was 65 years of age or older. The average household size was 2.06, and the average family size was 2.77.

The median age was 44 years; 19.3% of residents were under the age of 18, 6.0% were between the ages of 18 and 24, 25.8% were from 25 to 44, 28.1% were from 45 to 64, and 20.8% were 65 years of age or older. For every 100 females, there were 88.9 males. For every 100 females age 18 and over, there were 83.6 males.

The median income for a household in the city was $65,833, and the median income for a family was $96,859. Males had a median income of $51,000 versus $39,257 for females. The per capita income for the city was $63,859. None of the families and 2.3% of the population were living below the poverty line, including no under eighteens and 5.0% of those over 64.

Politics
Johanna Mouton has been the mayor since 2021.

Economy

Corporate headquarters

The corporate headquarters of both Cargill and Carlson are in Minnetonka, within  of Wayzata. They are two of the largest employers in the Wayzata area.

The regional bank TCF was founded in Wayzata in 1923. The company was headquartered in Wayzata until 2019.

Northern Oil and Gas, Inc. is headquartered in Wayzata.

Infrastructure
The United States Postal Service maintains a post office in Wayzata, which is assigned the ZIP code 55391. Although this ZIP code serves an area much larger than the city of Wayzata and includes seven other municipalities around eastern Lake Minnetonka, all locations in the ZIP code area use the name Wayzata in their postal addresses.

Education

Wayzata Public Schools are part of Independent School District (ISD) 284 and serve all or parts of eight west suburban municipalities (Plymouth, Corcoran, Hamel, Maple Grove, Medicine Lake, Medina, Minnetonka, and Orono). The only school within Wayzata's city limits is West Middle School. There are approximately 9,510 students enrolled in eight public elementary schools (K–5), three middle schools (6–8), and one high school (9–12). Some students in the area attend public schools in other school districts that their families choose under Minnesota's open enrollment statute. Wayzata is also home to the Highcroft campus of The Blake School (K–5). In 2012, Newsweek ranked Wayzata High School one of the top 1,000 public high schools in the United States.

Parks and recreation

Dakota Rail Regional Trail
The Dakota Rail Trail is a  paved regional trail. In Hennepin County, the trail winds around Lake Minnetonka through Wayzata, Orono, Minnetonka Beach, Spring Park, Mound, Minnetrista and Saint Bonifacius. The trail is managed by the Three River Park District. The trail is a converted railroad bed formerly owned by Dakota Rail. In 2001, the Hennepin County Regional Railroad Authority (HCRRSA) and Carver and McLeod Counties purchased the corridor. At a cost of $5.9 million, construction of the trail started in 2008. The trail offers parking and amenities.

Wayzata Beach
The Wayzata Beach is in downtown Wayzata on Lake Minnetonka. The beach is open to the public and has permit and non-permit parking. A lifeguard is on duty from mid-June to mid-August when the temperature is above 65 degrees Fahrenheit. The beach features:
 A sandy beach and grassy peninsula
 Shaded picnic areas
 Playground equipment
 Canoe racks
 Stand-up paddleboard rentals
 Volleyball court
 Boat slips
 Playing fields

In popular culture
In the 1990s TV series Beverly Hills, 90210, Brandon Walsh (Jason Priestley) and Brenda Walsh (Shannen Doherty) moved to California from Wayzata. In the show, both characters mispronounce Wayzata as "Way-za-da."

In the 1996 film Fargo, Jerry Lundegaard intends to purchase a parking lot in Wayzata.

Much of the 1999 film Drop Dead Gorgeous (starring Kirsten Dunst, Kirstie Alley, Denise Richards, Allison Janney, Ellen Barkin, Brittany Murphy, and Amy Adams) was filmed in Wayzata. Scenes were filmed at West Middle School, the Wayzata VFW, and 634 Park Street.

The character Ben Linus in the TV series Lost assumed the identity of a Henry Gale from Wayzata, Minnesota. In the show, the character mispronounces Wayzata as "Why-Zah-tah."

Aerial shots of Wayzata were featured in the fourth episode of the 2018 TV series The Assassination of Gianni Versace: American Crime Story.

Notable people
 Salisbury Adams, Minnesota state legislator and lawyer
 James Ford Bell, first president of General Mills
 Rufus Rand, politician and business executive
 Douglas Dayton, first president of Target
 Marchette Chute, U.S. author and biographer
 Dick Beardsley, long-distance runner and winner of the 1981 London Marathon
 Kent DuChaine, American blues singer and guitarist
 Kimberly Elise, film and television actress (alumna of Wayzata Senior High)
 Orlando J. Heinitz, politician and businessman
 Tim Herron, American professional golfer
 James Laurinaitis, linebacker for the Saint Louis Rams
 John Sharpless, University of Wisconsin–Madison professor
 Lorie Line, pianist
 David Bromstad, designer and television personality
 Jim Ramstad, U.S. Representative
 Betsy Hodges, Mayor of Minneapolis from 2014 to 2018
 Amy Klobuchar, U.S. Senator (alumna of Wayzata Senior High)
 Robert L. Searles, Minnesota state representative and businessman

References

External links
 

City of Wayzata
Wayzata Historical Society
Wayzata Public Schools

 
Cities in Hennepin County, Minnesota
Cities in Minnesota
Populated places established in 1883
Dakota toponyms